Roscoe Thattil (born 4 July 1992) is a Sri Lankan cricketer. He made his first-class debut for Sri Lanka Air Force Sports Club in the 2011–12 Premier Trophy on 5 February 2012.

References

External links
 

1992 births
Living people
Sri Lankan cricketers
Badureliya Sports Club cricketers
Sri Lanka Air Force Sports Club cricketers
Tincomalee District cricketers
Cricketers from Colombo